Bezawada Bebbuli is a 1983 Indian Telugu-language film, directed by Vijaya Nirmala and produced by Atluri Tulasidas. The film stars Krishna, Raadhika, Sivaji Ganesan and Sowkar Janaki. The film had musical score by K. Chakravarthy.

Cast
Krishna as Venu
Raadhika as Lata
Shivaji Ganesan as Ravindra and ASP Raghu
Vijaya Nirmala
Sripriya as Madhavi
Sowkar Janaki
Kaikala Satyanarayana as Govardhan
Veerabhadra Rao as Achari
Mikkilineni as Veerabhadra Gajapati
Peketi Sivaram
Sakshi Ranga Rao
Mada as Inspector
Chitti Babu

References

External links

 

1983 films
Films scored by K. Chakravarthy
1980s Telugu-language films
Films directed by Vijaya Nirmala